Harry Marcoplos (born January 28, 1926) was an American field hockey player. He competed at the 1948 Summer Olympics and the 1956 Summer Olympics.

References

External links
 

1926 births
Living people
American male field hockey players
Olympic field hockey players of the United States
Field hockey players at the 1948 Summer Olympics
Field hockey players at the 1956 Summer Olympics
Sportspeople from Baltimore